Dedo I may refer to:

 Dedo I of Wettin (c. 950 – 1009)
 Dedi I, Margrave of the Saxon Ostmark  (1004–1075)